Hammamet is a 2020 Italian biographical drama co-written and directed by Gianni Amelio, based on the last years of life of Bettino Craxi (1934–2000), a controversial Italian politician who was the Secretary of the Italian Socialist Party, served as Prime Minister during the 1980s and later fled to Tunisia to avoid legal prosecution on corruption charges during the Mani Pulite scandal. Craxi is portrayed by Pierfrancesco Favino.

The film was released shortly before the 20th anniversary of Craxi's death, which occurred on 19 January 2000 in the Tunisian town of  Hammamet, where he had lived since 1994 to avoid serving a 27-years in jail sentence because of his corruption crimes.

Plot
During the late 1990s, after escaping from Italy to avoid imprisonment, the old and ill Bettino Craxi is spending his last days with his wife and daughter in his villa in Hammamet, Tunisia. His new life as a fallen leader and as a fugitive is now dedicated to meeting family members, old friends and obscure figures from his past.

Cast

Production
Filming began on 18 March 2019 and took place in Pavia, Italy and Hammamet, Tunisia.

Release
The first promotional images were released on 13 March 2019, while the first theatrical trailer was released on 18 December 2019.

References

External links
  
 

Films directed by Gianni Amelio
Biographical films about politicians
Italian biographical drama films
Films scored by Nicola Piovani
2020s Italian films
2020s Italian-language films